Tej Narayan Singh Yadav also spelt Narain is an Indian politician. He was elected to the Lok Sabha, the lower house of the Parliament of India from Buxar,  Bihar as a member of the Communist Party of India.

References

External links
  Official biographical sketch on the Parliament of India website

1941 births
Communist Party of India politicians from Bihar
Lok Sabha members from Bihar
India MPs 1989–1991
India MPs 1991–1996
Living people